The Ministry of Finance of Eritrea is responsible for the public finance policies of Eritrea. The ministry is located in Asmara.

Ministers of Finance
Haile Woldense, 1993-1997
Ghebreselassie Yoseph, 1997-2001
Berhane Abrehe, 2001-2014
Berhane Habtemariam, 2014-

See also 
 Finance ministry
 Economy of Eritrea
 Government of Eritrea

References

Eritrea
Government of Eritrea
1993 establishments in Eritrea